The Gift is the 19th story in the Big Finish anthology Short Trips: The History of Christmas, written by Robert Dick and based on the long-running British science fiction television series Doctor Who which features the First Doctor and Susan.

Plot
General (Brigadier) Alistair Lethbridge-Stewart has retired and convinced his wife, Doris, to buy him a boat for Christmas. On Christmas Eve, whilst Doris is doing some late-night shopping, Alistair takes the boat out for a pre-Christmas test drive (unbeknownst to his wife). During his trip, Alistair spots a young girl in the water. Taking her back to his house, an argument ensues with the recently returned Doris over whether they should call the emergency services or whether Alistair should deal with the situation himself. Their disagreement is interrupted by the arrival of an old man looking for his granddaughter. Despite never meeting this incarnation, Alistair Lethbridge-Stewart believes that the old man is the Doctor.

At first the Doctor appears very concerned for Susan's well-being; however, after hearing Doris protest about ever buying the boat for Alistair, the Doctor appears to forget all about Susan and becomes more interested in Alistair's boat.  When the Doctor suggests the boat be sold, Alistair gets very upset and leaves the house in a rage.

Without Alistair present, Doris suggests to the Doctor that he indeed knows her husband before today's encounter. Confiding in Doris, the Doctor confirms that he recognises Alistair as one of his oldest friends, despite not having physically met Lethbridge-Stewart in his own timeline. Realising that this whole “Susan” incident was just a ploy to meet Alistair, Doris asks the Doctor how her husband will die. Unable to answer her question directly, the Doctor tells her that all of his incarnations will be present at the funeral and will behave themselves (though some will argue at the wake). However, when Doris asks the Doctor to take the boat away with him, he replies that he unable to do so, as such a decision cannot be made by him.  However, the Doctor implies that this is his Christmas gift to the Lethbridge-Stewart family:  the gift of choice.

When Alistair returns, the Doctor and Susan have left, leaving the Brigadier and Doris to make the decision together.

Story chronology

The Doctor and Susan are travelling alone and are at ease with humanity. However, the pair have not yet established themselves in 1960's London - placing this story after Frayed and before the first TV episode 100,000 BC

Big Finish Short Trips